David Fielding (born June 20, 1955) is an American politician and a Democratic member of the Arkansas House of Representatives representing District 5 since January 2011.

Education
Fielding attended Southern Arkansas University.

Elections
2022 Fielding was opposed for the November 8, 2022 General Election. Losing the race to Republican Wade Andrews.
2012 Fielding was unopposed for both the May 22, 2012 Democratic primary and the November 6, 2012 general election.
2010 When District 5 Representative Willie Hardy left the Legislature and left the seat open, Fielding placed first in the three-way May 18, 2010 Democratic Primary with 1,866 votes (49.6%), won the June 8 runoff election with 1,545 votes (53.7%), and was unopposed for the November 2, 2010 General election.

References

External links
Official page at the Arkansas House of Representatives

David Fielding at Ballotpedia
David Fielding at OpenSecrets

Place of birth missing (living people)
1955 births
Living people
African-American state legislators in Arkansas
Democratic Party members of the Arkansas House of Representatives
People from Columbia County, Arkansas
Southern Arkansas University alumni
21st-century American politicians
21st-century African-American politicians
20th-century African-American people